Pseuderanthemum subauriculatum is a species of plant in the family Acanthaceae. It is endemic to Ecuador.  Its natural habitat is subtropical or tropical moist lowland forests. It is threatened by habitat loss.

References

Flora of Ecuador
subauriculatum
Near threatened plants
Taxonomy articles created by Polbot